Metal is the twelfth album by Canadian heavy metal band Annihilator, released on April 16, 2007 by SPV/Steamhammer. However, it wasn't released in the United States until January 15, 2008. The album includes several special guests who each contribute to separate tracks. This includes Danko Jones, Angela Gossow, Steve "Lips" Kudlow, Alexi Laiho, Anders Björler, Michael Amott, Jesper Strömblad, Corey Beaulieu, Jacob Lynam and William Adler

Reception

2007's Metal was received rather negatively by fans and received mixed to decent reviews from critics.
From Metal Storm a reviewer gave it a positive review, stating that while the idea to have a guest on each song of the CD is good, the problem is that "it can sound a bit "false" sometimes too. I mean that it can be a bit like a copy-paste when the musicians didn't really work together. If a song like "Army Of One" with its federator Metal chorus or "Downright Dominate" sounds like a real collaboration some other songs like "Clown Parade" (even with an incredible solo performed by Jeff Loomis) or Couple Suicide (especially with the choruses performed by Angela Gossow) are a bit more unnatural." Following this they spoke on the positives of the album, complimenting the fact that "the riffs are great, the solos are exceptional, the voice of Dave Padden is good but definitely not "thrashy" so even if it's pleasant to listen to "Metal", that's a fact it's not a real album of Thrash Metal a la Kreator or Slayer." They ended their review with "Metal is not the album of the year. It's not a perfect and pure Thrash album too, but it's always cool to listen to it, and definitely, Jeff Waters knows how to write some great killer riffs and I'm quite sure that the new songs will be great live. Don't expect real Thrash here but for sure you can expect some good nice music."

Metal II (2022)
Reception of the 2022 re-recording has been positive from fans and rang from decent to negative from critics. A reviewer from The Moshville Times questioned its existence, unsure as to why it was made. "I just don’t see the point of it, the changes being so minor compared to the original. Both releases have excellent production, and the major differences are in the drum fills. I’d have to say that this is one for the completist, or for someone who doesn’t already have Metal already. A curiosity rather than a necessity." Of Louder Sound a reviewer of Metal Hammer spoke more harshly of the album, saying that "the songs are as bland now as ever. Army Of One idolizes metal with the creativity of a Wikipedia list (‘Anthrax! Motörhead! Exodus! Slayer! Bang your head!’), while the album’s melodies couldn’t be flatter if they were pummelled beneath an iron foundry press. This is especially true of Couple Suicide’s glam schmaltz, where Danko Jones and Angela Gossow’s vocals have been mechanized and muddied by time." they concluded their review by stating that "If terrible ideas weighed a gram, this would be heavier than the Eiffel Tower."  

A more positive review came from BlabberMouth where the reviewer spoke positively of the album, saying that "[Metal] feels like an excellent entry point for diehard fans and newcomers. The title tells you what to expect. The album delivers. Your neck is going to hurt."

Track listing

Metal II
Metal II, a near complete re-recording of Metal, was released on February 18, 2022, which serves as a tribute to Eddie Van Halen and Alexi Laiho, the latter of whom appears posthumously on one of the album's re-recorded tracks "Downright Dominate", which also features Dave Lombardo on drums and Stu Block on vocals. In January 2022, Jeff Waters announced that he would be once again stepping down as lead vocalist and focusing solely on lead guitar while Stu Block would handle lead vocals on the band's future live shows.

Personnel

Metal
Band
Dave Padden – vocals, rhythm guitars
Jeff Waters – lead guitar, bass, and lead vocals on "Operation Annihilation"
Mike Mangini – drums

Session Members
Danko Jones - vocals (track 2)
Angela Gossow - vocals (track 2)
William Adler - guitars (lead) (track 10)
Corey Beaulieu - guitars (lead) (track 8)
Alexi Laiho - guitars (lead) (track 4)
Michael Amott - guitars (lead) (track 6)
Jeff Loomis - guitars (lead) (track 1)
Anders Björler - guitars (lead) (track 5)
Jesper Strömblad - guitars (lead) (track 7)
Steve "Lips" Kudlow - guitars (lead) (track 3)
Jacob Lynam - guitars (lead) (track 9)
Allan Johnson - bass (track 11), backing vocals
Dan Beehler - drums, vocals (track 11), backing vocals
Jacques Bélanger - backing vocals
John Perinbam - backing vocals
Paul Malek - backing vocals
Brian Stephenson - backing vocals
Bob Walden - backing vocals
Scott Walsh - backing vocals

Miscellaneous staff
Jeff Waters - engineering, mixing, producer
Jeff Yurek - engineering
Andy Sneap - engineering
Vic Florencia - engineering
Ben Schigel - engineering (additional)
Adam Ayan - mastering
Gyula Havancsák - cover art, design

Metal II
Band
Stu Block – lead vocals
Jeff Waters – guitars, bass, co-lead vocals
Dave Lombardo – drums

Session Members
Danko Jones - vocals (track 4)
Angela Gossow - vocals (track 4)
Dan Beehler - drums, vocals (track 5)
Allan Johnson - bass (track 5)
Willie Adler - guitars (lead) (track 1)
Alexi Laiho - guitars (lead) (tracks 2, 7)
Steve "Lips" Kudlow - guitars (lead) (track 3)
Jesper Strömblad - guitars (lead) (track 6)
Jacob Lynam - guitars (lead) (track 8)
Jeff Loomis - guitars (lead) (track 9)
Anders Björler	- guitars (lead) (track 10)
Corey Beaulieu	- guitars (lead) (track 11)

Miscellaneous staff
Mike Fraser - mixing, engineering
Maor Appelbaum	- remastering

References

External links
kvltsite.com review

Annihilator (band) albums
2007 albums
SPV/Steamhammer albums